The 1919–20 season was Cardiff City F.C.'s 19th season of competitive football and the team's sixth and final one in the Southern Football League. They competed in the 22-team Southern Football League First Division, then the third tier of English football, finishing 4th. For the following season Cardiff were elected to the Football League Second Division following the creation of a new Third Division and the addition of two new places in the Second Division in the Football League.

Season review

Southern Football League Division One

Partial league table

Results by round

Players
First team squad.

Fixtures and results

Southern League Division One

FA Cup

Welsh Cup

Source

References

Bibliography

Cardiff City F.C. seasons
Association football clubs 1919–20 season
Card